Villapañada is one of 28 parishes (administrative divisions) in the municipality of Grado, within the province and autonomous community of Asturias, in northern Spain. 

The population is 204 (INE 2007).

Villages and hamlets include:  Acebedo, La Barraca, La Linar, La Llamiella, Rozadas and San Juan.

References

Parishes in Grado